Catherine A. Roberts (born Feb.5, 1965 in Boston, Massachusetts) is an American applied mathematician, the Executive Director of the American Mathematical Society,  and a professor of mathematics at the College of the Holy Cross.

Education 
Roberts graduated, magna cum laude, from Bowdoin College in 1987 with an A.B. in Mathematics & Art History and a teacher certification in math. She graduated from Northwestern University in 1992 with a Ph.D in Applied Mathematics & Engineering Sciences.

Professional career 
Roberts was an assistant professor of mathematics at the University of Rhode Island from 1992-1995. She then was appointed an assistant professor at Northern Arizona University from 1995-1998 and from 1998-2001 she worked as an associate professor at that same University. Roberts was appointed an associate professor at the College of the Holy Cross from 2001-2013 and a full professor from 2013-2018. From 2004-2016 she served as the Editor-in-Chief of the Natural Resource Modeling journal. Roberts is the Executive Director of the American Mathematical Society, having been appointed in 2016.

Recognition
Roberts was selected as a Fellow of the Association for Women in Mathematics in the Class of 2021 "for leadership in the AWM and the American Mathematical Society; and for promoting women in mathematics at every career stage, both by mentoring individuals to become strong and confident mathematicians and by working for systemic change".

Research 
Roberts' research focused on the analysis of nonlinear Volterra integral equations that arise in studies involving diffusive media as well as the mathematical modeling of interactions between humans and their natural environment. The objective of these studies is to investigate the phenomena of explosion, quenching, and anomalous diffusion within a diffusive medium in the context of nonlinear Volterra integral equations. These problems are characterized by spatially localized nonlinearities, distinguishing them from the work of earlier researchers. Such nonlinearities are motivated, for example, by applications where the event occurs within a very confined area (e.g., flooding events in porous media, internal electrode energy stimulation on a heated surface).

These phenomena are of wide importance in applications. Studies of explosion have been conducted on theoretical models that are originally presented as nonlinear partial differential equations. Unlike previous studies, which have required a smoothness property for spatially dependent nonlinearities, this research replaces such requirements by strongly localized behavior. In this case, conversion of the theoretical models from partial differential equations to integral equations represents a very effective format for the analysis. This reformulation permits a more direct and efficient inquiry into the challenging scenario of spatially localized nonlinear behavior.

Her work with interactions between humans and their natural environment sought to characterize complex human-environment interactions in a recreational setting. Specifically, the research studied problems related to human decision-making and how it influences the routing of recreational white water rafting traffic on rivers. This research developed traffic models that simulate the responses of humans to an ever-changing natural environment. Roberts developed the Grand Canyon River Trip Simulator. This model uses artificial intelligence and statistical techniques to capture the unique nature of this interaction.

Personal life 
Roberts was born in 1965 in Boston, Massachusetts. Her family subsequently moved to Cape Cod, Massachusetts where her father opened a law practice and her mother became an important civic leader and social advocate in the community. Roberts enjoyed a happy childhood growing up with her 3 sisters. She loved her childhood of swimming in the ocean and the ponds of Cape Cod. Roberts met her spouse while living in Chatham and attending high school. Roberts' spouse is a chemistry professor at Worcester Polytechnic Institute. She and her husband have two sons both currently attending colleges.

References 

American women mathematicians
Northwestern University alumni
College of the Holy Cross faculty
University of Rhode Island faculty
Northern Arizona University faculty
Living people
1965 births
Fellows of the Association for Women in Mathematics
21st-century American women